Kateřina Teplá  is a Czech Paralympic alpine skier. She represented Czechoslovakia, and later the Czech Republic, in alpine skiing at the Winter Paralympic Games between 1992 and 2002 , winning nine medals, five golds and four silver.

Career 
Teplá competed at the 1992 Winter Paralympics held in Albertville, winning silver medals in the giant slalom and super-G.

She competed at the 1998 Winter Paralympics, winning winning gold medals in slalom, giant slalom, and super-G.

She competed at the 2002 Winter Paralympics, winning a gold medal in Women's giant slalom, and Women's super-G, and silver medal in Women's downhill.

References

External links 

 11 Mar 2002: Katerina Tepla of Czech Republic on her way to silver in the women's B3 Super-G during the Salt Lake City Winter Paralympic Games at the Snowbasin ski area in Ogden, Utah. Adam Pretty /Getty Images

Year of birth missing (living people)
Living people
Paralympic alpine skiers of the Czech Republic
Czech female alpine skiers
Alpine skiers at the 1992 Winter Paralympics
Alpine skiers at the 1998 Winter Paralympics
Alpine skiers at the 2002 Winter Paralympics
Medalists at the 1992 Winter Paralympics
Medalists at the 1998 Winter Paralympics
Medalists at the 2002 Winter Paralympics
Paralympic gold medalists for the Czech Republic
Paralympic silver medalists for the Czech Republic